Diederik Bangma (born 22 May 1990) is a Dutch football goalkeeper who currently play for German Regionalliga Nord club Cloppenburg. Previously he played for Dutch top flight club SC Heerenveen.

Club career
During his early years Bangma played at GVVV Veenendaal before being picked up by the youth academy of SC Heerenveen in 2004.

In June 2009 Bangma signed his first deal that would keep him at the Abe Lenstra Stadion until the summer of 2011. In the 2009/2010 season he was the fourth goalkeeper in the hierarchy.  Due to injuries of Kenny Steppe, Brian Vandenbussche and Martin Lejsal he debuted on February 27, 2010, in the match against Heracles Almelo. This was his only appearance in the first squad, since the club signed veteran Henk Timmer for the rest of the season as first goalkeeper.

In the summer of 2011 Bangma joined amateur-club WKE on a free transfer, which played in the Topklasse, the third level in Dutch football. He moved to Achilles 1894 in 2015 only to join German Regionalliga Nord club Cloppenburg in February 2016.

References

External links
Profile
Contract for goalkeeper Bangma (Dutch)

1990 births
Living people
People from Rhenen
Association football goalkeepers
Dutch footballers
Eredivisie players
Eerste Divisie players
SC Heerenveen players
FC Emmen players
WKE players
Dutch expatriate footballers
Expatriate footballers in Germany
Dutch expatriate sportspeople in Germany
Achilles 1894 players
Footballers from Utrecht (province)